Amber L. Hollibaugh (born 1946) is an American writer, filmmaker and political activist, largely concerned with feminist and sexual politics.

Career and writings
Hollibaugh is the daughter of a dark-skinned Romany father, and a white Irish-American mother. She claims her paternal family were from Spain and came to the United States in the early 1900s. Her father grew up traveling in caravans, and was harassed and branded by the Ku Klux Klan. Amber has also claimed her father and maternal grandmother were branded by the KKK. According to her publisher's website,  "Amber L. Hollibaugh is a lesbian sex radical, ex-hooker, incest survivor, gypsy child, poor-white-trash, high femme dyke. She is also an award-winning filmmaker, feminist, Left political organizer, public speaker, and journalist."

Her father, Ace L. Hollibaugh was born to Roy Hollibaugh and Helen Hollibaugh, both white.

Hollibaugh is the former Chief Officer of Elder & LBTI Women's Services at Howard Brown Health Center in Chicago. She has been director of education, advocacy and community building at (Services & Advocacy for GLBT Elders) (SAGE), a New York program dedicated to lesbian, gay, bisexual, and transgender senior education, advocacy, and community organizing.

In 1970, Hollibaugh was a leader in the Canadian movement for abortion rights. In 1978, she was a co-founder with Allan Bérubé and others of the San Francisco Lesbian and Gay History Project. In 1982, she was a speaker at the 1982 Barnard Conference on Sexuality, a key event in what became known as the Feminist Sex Wars. Hollibaugh has written on the marginalization she experienced afterwards as a result of being a former sex worker and her involvement in the sadomasochism community.

Hollibaugh was the director and co-producer with Gini Reticker of The Heart of the Matter, a 60-minute documentary film about the confusing messages women students receive about sexuality and sexually transmitted diseases such as AIDS. The film won the 1994 Sundance Film Festival Freedom of Expression Award; it premiered to a national audience on PBS.

In the 1990s, Hollibaugh argued that American liberalism was in disarray, but was looking to the Left for guidance in how to reshape itself. Stafford has analyzed her memoir My Dangerous Desires (2000) in terms of femme lesbian narratives.

In 2002, Jenrose Fitzgerald discussed Hollibaugh and Singh's 1999 essay Sexuality, Labor, and the New Trade Unionism in Social Text. Fitzgerald says that their presentation of the relationship between sexual politics and the labor movement proposed a labor movement "that will take on immigration issues, racism, health care, and the nuances of economic inequality alongside more mainstream labor and 'gay rights' concerns."

In Hollibaugh's writings on sexuality, she has declared that "there is no human hope without the promise of ecstasy."

Meryl Altman says that Hollibaugh is "a powerful organizing speaker, a very fine incisive writer and a brilliant theorist."

In 2012, Hollibaugh received the Vicki Sexual Freedom Award from the Woodhull Freedom Foundation.

Publications

Book
 

 Pdf.

Articles and essays

Further reading 
  Amber Hollibaugh; Mitchell Karp; and Katy Taylor interviewed by Douglas Crimp.

Notes

1946 births
American prostitutes
American feminists
American people of Irish descent
American people of Romani descent
American people of Spanish descent
Historians of LGBT topics
Lesbian feminists
American lesbian writers
Living people
People of Spanish-Romani descent
Sex-positive feminists
American left-wing activists
Lesbian memoirists
LGBT film directors
21st-century American LGBT people
21st-century American women writers
Romani feminists